George V has been portrayed on screen by:
 Derek Erskine in the 1925 silent film The Scarlet Woman: An Ecclesiastical Melodrama
 Charles Fredericks in the 1964 film My Fair Lady
 Carleton Hobbs in the 1965 film A King's Story
 Michael Osborne in the 1975 ATV drama series Edward the Seventh
 Marius Goring in the 1978 Thames Television series Edward & Mrs. Simpson
 Keith Varnier in the 1978 LWT drama series Lillie
 Rene Aranda in the 1980 film The Fiendish Plot of Dr. Fu Manchu
 Terence Brook in the 1981 drama series The Life and Times of David Lloyd George
 Guy Deghy in the 1981 Southern Television drama series Winston Churchill: The Wilderness Years
 Andrew Gilmour in the 1985 Australian miniseries A Thousand Skies
 David Ravenswood in the 1990 Australian TV miniseries The Great Air Race
 John Warner in the 1991 RTÉ TV drama The Treaty
 David Troughton in the 1999 BBC TV drama All the King's Men
 Rupert Frazer in the 2002 TV miniseries Shackleton
 Alan Bates in the 2002 Carlton Television drama Bertie and Elizabeth
 Tom Hollander in the 2003 BBC miniseries The Lost Prince
 Clifford Rose in the 2005 TV drama Wallis & Edward
 Julian Wadham in the 2007 TV drama My Boy Jack
 Michael Gambon in the 2010 film The King's Speech
 James Fox in the 2011 film W.E.
 Guy Williams in the 2013 Christmas episode of Downton Abbey
 Simon Jones in the 2019 film Downton Abbey
 Richard Dillane in the 2022 fifth season of  The Crown